Paola Pinna (born 11 November 1974) is an Italian politician.

Born in Cagliari, Pinna graduated in Political Science, and earned an MBA in Business Management at the LUISS School of Government in Rome.  
She worked for seven years  for a network of travel agencies.

In 2013 Pinna was elected deputy  for the 5 Star Movement. On 27 November 2014, she was expelled from her party for allegedly not having given part of his salary as a parliamentarian  to charity, as prescribed by the movement. She defended herself publishing the accounts of her donations on her Facebook page  and then declaring she had been expelled for her criticism towards Beppe Grillo following the defeat in 2014 regional elections in Emilia-Romagna and Calabria. On March 26, 2015, Pinna joined the parliamentary group of Civic Choice.

References

External links 

Italian Chamber of Deputies - Paola Pinna

1974 births
Living people
People from Cagliari
Five Star Movement politicians
Civic Choice politicians
Democratic Party (Italy) politicians
Deputies of Legislature XVII of Italy
Politicians of Sardinia
21st-century Italian women politicians
Sardinian women
Women members of the Chamber of Deputies (Italy)